Benjamin Flynn (born 23 August 1970 in London), known professionally as Eine, is an English artist based in London.

Life and career
Eine became known for his alphabet lettering on shop shutters. Some of these letters have been mapped for ease of finding. He has also taken his lettering to the streets of Paris, Stockholm, Hastings and Newcastle upon Tyne.

Eine first started to explore more commercial avenues in a workshop above the Dragon Bar in Leonard Street, London (since demolished). Eine produced a number of custom clothing designs notably some custom "VANDALS" sweatshirts  and started to explore screen prints, eventually founding the cult screen print company Pictures On Walls (POW) with Banksy. Eine produced many of the hand pulled prints for artists represented by POW including Jamie Hewlett, Mode2, Modern Toss and David Shrigley. His natural talent for colour combinations meant that he was able to enhance the work supplied by the artists. He left this position to continue to pursue his own solo career in 2008.

At this time Eine contributed to sticker graffiti and was prolific in East London with his neon and black EINE stickers (multiple EINE names).

Eine first came to prominence in the "commercial" graffiti scene through his symbiotic partnership with the London graffiti artist Banksy; through Eine, Banksy was able to access the underground scene and through Banksy Eine accessed the commercial world.

In his commercial work he has produced numerous lettering styles including Shutter, NewCircus, Neon, Elton, Vandalism, Tenderloin and Wendy.

In 2007, the Tower Hamlets Partnership began to survey residents of Brick Lane to ask whether they considered his graffiti offensive and should be removed. The result was that the council treated graffiti as vandalism.  The Council has since revised the policy on graffiti, aiming to keep street art that is popular and unoffensive because it attracts tourism. (reference no longer valid)

In May 2010 Ben Eine painted a complete alphabet on Middlesex Street in East London. The shutters and murals on which he painted his colours and typography can be seen in London's Shoreditch, Brick Lane and Broadway Market areas. Middlesex Street was re-christened Alphabet Street by the residents and described by The Times as "a street now internationally recognized as a living piece of art with direct links to The White House".

In July 2010, President Barack Obama was presented with a painting by Eine, Twenty First Century City, as an official gift from the British prime minister, David Cameron. Eine was so surprised that he subsequently created "The Strangest Week", an artwork of giant letters made out of "smileys" along Hackney Road.

Eine's solo show (March 2011) at White Walls gallery in San Francisco sold out prior to opening. He was also included in the biggest exhibition of street art to date "Art in the Streets" at MOCA, Los Angeles, in April 2011.

Eine's work was featured at Art Below's The Peace Project. His work at the show contained his graffiti typography. One of his pieces that simply spelled out the word love titled "Circus Love" was displayed at Regent's Park. This had previously being featured in Art Below's July 2012 show where it was placed on the wall of Oxford Circus tube station on the Central Line. Eine joined a growing list of street artists who have exhibited with Art Below such as Banksy, Inkie, Mike Ballard and Goldie.

In 2012, the typographer Chank Diesel released Tenderloin, a free font designed in collaboration with Eine.

In 2013, Edition House and Gallery Nelly Duff released "Tenderloin A-Z", a 52-colour silkscreen based on the Tenderloin font.

In 2020 Ben Eine designed a pod for the London Eye's 20th anniversary 

In January 2020, Central Saint Martins college named a class room after Ben Eine.

Charitable work
Throughout Eine's career, he has made numerous charitable contributions, including donations to Shelter and War Child through sales at Christie's auction house.

Eine joined efforts towards raising awareness and support around mental health with the Movember Foundation and Sotheby’s Charity Auction, who launched a sale of ten dynamic new works from acclaimed street artists across the globe. Spearheaded by the artist D*Face, the initiative included original pieces from Felipe Pantone, Shepard Fairey, Jonathan Yeo, Invader, Okuda, Alexis Diaz, Conor Harrington and Vhils. Collectively, "each artist created an agenda-setting piece motivated by, and aimed at nurturing, open conversations surrounding men’s mental health and suicide prevention".

Eine also campaigned for an end to knife crime violence with street art pieces including "Peace Is Possible" and "Stop Knife Crime".

Eine has also created works to support human rights, such as his "Brave" piece, and chosen to participate in exhibitions, like MACAM’s Wall of Contemplation, which celebrated the 70th anniversary of the Universal Declaration of Human Rights.

Youth empowerment and development has also been an issue Eine ha contributed towards by participating in projects such as Youth Unity Day, to inspire positivity and draw young people away from violence.

In 2011, Eine was invited by Amnesty International to design its 50th anniversary poster, joining other artists such as Picasso and Joan Miró in supporting the charity through art.

Other endeavours 
In January 2018, Eine launched the first collection for his clothing company EINE London, at London Fashion Week: Men's.

In August 2019, Eine launched his creative studio OurTypes. To celebrate the launch of OurTypes he painted every letter of the alphabet on shutters in East London. OurTypes is a multidisciplinary creative studio focused on words. It collaborates with other artists on font releases and global brands on commercial projects. In August 2019, OurTypes launched Eine's most notorious typeface, New Circus font, for personal use.

Eine in popular culture 

In January 2008, Eine was featured in an article in London's Time Out magazine as one of the six best new street artists working in the capital.

There is a chapter on Eine in Street Renegades: New Underground Art by Francesca Gavin and he is also featured in The Art Of Rebellion 2: World Of Urban Art Activism by Christian Hundertmark, and he was featured in Sebastian Peiter's documentary Guerilla Art.

Eine's lettering is often used in magazines and promotional material. His work was used prominently by the pop group Alphabeat and in Duffy's music video for "Stepping Stone" and also, briefly, in Snow Patrol's video for "Take Back the City". Eine’s work can also be seen in the streets of the video game Grand Theft Auto.

Assault Conviction 

on July 10, 2018, Eine plead guilty to assault by beating and criminal damage, the victim was his girlfriend at the time. This incident occurred on June 6, 2018 at a private view of the artist Tomma Abts' exhibition at the Serpentine Sackler Gallery. Testimony provided during the July 10, 2018 court hearing indicated that Eine physically assaulted his girlfriend in response to her accusation of cheating that arose during their attendance at the exhibition. As per the testimony of the victim, "He punched me in the face … in the mouth with a clenched fist, with some force.  I was bleeding from the mouth."

Exhibitions

Solo shows 
2018: "Everything Starts Somewhere", Bruton Art Factory, Bruton (UK)

2018: "Everything Starts Somewhere", Stolen Space Gallery, London (UK)

2017: "Home Sweet Homeless", Jealous Gallery, London (UK)

2017: "STREET ART", Heather James Fine Art, Palm Desert (USA)

2015: "Your Not My Type", StolenSpace Gallery, London (UK)

2014: "HEARTFELT", Judith Charles Gallery, New York (USA)

2013: "INNOCENCE", Corey Helford Gallery, Los Angeles (USA)

2013: "OUCH", Project One Gallery, San Francisco (USA]

2012: "COLOR OR COLOUR", Charles Bank Gallery, New York (USA)

2011: "Love/Hate", Megumi Ogita Gallery, Tokyo (Japan)

2011: "GREATEST", White Walls, San Francisco (USA)

2009: "EINE World Record Attempt Show", Nelly Duff, London (UK)

2009: "The A-Z of Change", Carmichael Gallery, Los Angeles (USA)

2008: "When The Lights Go Out" – Andenken Gallery, Denver, (USA)

2007: Vandalism – Kemistry Gallery, London, (UK)

2007: Portobello Film Festival – Westbourne Studios, London, (UK)

Group shows 
2019: "Wall Of Contemplation", MACAM, Byblos (Lebanon)

2019: "20 Years Smiling With Friends", Stolen Space Gallery, London (UK)

2019: "Random Acts of Kindness", Semi Skimmed Gallery, London (UK)

2019: "XYZ", GoGallery, Amsterdam (Netherlands)

2019: "Lucky 13 Anniversary Show Pt. 1: Fine Art of Street & Graffiti", Corey Helford Gallery, Los Angeles (USA)

2018: “ALL CAPS”, LCD Gallery, Houston [USA] 

2018: "Crossover", Galerie Kronsbein, Munich (Germany)

2018: "For All Mankind", Attollo Art, London (UK)

2018: "Emerging to Established", Krause Gallery, New York (USA)

2018: "Transcript", Charlie Smith London, London (UK)

2018: "Opening", Urban Nation Museum, Berlin (Germany)

2017: "In Memoriam Francesca Lowe", Charlie Smith London, London (UK)

2016: "Urban Art Preview", Galerie Kronsbein, Munich (Germany)

2016: "Uplift", Black Book Gallery, Englewood (USA)

2015: "MUCA COLLECTION", MUCA, Munich (Germany)

2014: "Spectrum", StolenSpace Gallery, London (UK)

2014: "Amazing Summer", MUCA, Munich (Germany)

2014: "M/5", Urban Nation Museum, Berlin (Germany)

2013: "The Wooster Collective 10th Anniversary Show", Jonathan LeVine Gallery, Jersey City (USA)

2012: "Winter Group Show", White Walls Gallery, San Francisco (USA)

2012: "Love & Hate", Stolen Space Gallery, London (UK)

2012: "Street Art: from the Victoria and Albert Museum, London and Libya", Dar Al Fagi Hassan Art Gallery, Tripoli (Libya)

2011: "Unfair: Part 1", Whisper Gallery, London (UK)

2011: "MTV: RE:DEFINE", Goss-Michael Foundation, Dallas (USA)

2011: "Art in the Streets", Museum of Contemporary Art (MOCA), Los Angeles (USA)

2011: "Gossip Well Told", Moniker, London (UK)

2011: "Zero-Sixty" Corey Helford Gallery, Los Angeles (USA)

2011: "Street Art – Meanwhile in deepest East Anglia, thunderbirds were go", Von Der Heydt Museum, Wuppertal (Germany)

2011: "The Beer Mat Show", Cedar Lewisohn, London (UK)

2010: "Faces", Electric Blue Gallery, London (UK)

2009: "Corked", Cork Street Gallery, London (UK)

2008: "4 Geezers", Ad Hoc Art, New York (The London Police, Flying Fortress, Pez and Eine) (USA)

2008: "Urban Art" Weserburg Museum of Modern Art, Bremen (Germany)

2008: "Make Over", Stella Dore Gallery, London, (UK)

2008: "Cans Festival", Leake Street, London, (UK)

2008: "Stella Dore" Sebastian Guinness Gallery, Dublin (Ireland)

2007: "Santa's Ghetto", West Bank, Bethlehem (Israel)

2007: "For Life, Not Just For Christmas" Open Studio Spaces, London (UK)

2007: "Urban Sprawl", Leonard Street Gallery, London (UK)

2007: "Eleven", Leonard Street Gallery, London (UK)

2006: "Santa's Ghetto", Oxford Street, London (UK)

2006: "UK Jack OK", Colette, Paris (France)

2005: "Santa's Ghetto", Oxford Street, London (UK)

2005: "POW Group Show", Allmänna Galleriet, Stockholm (Sweden)

2004: "Santa's Ghetto", Oxford Street, London (UK)

2003: "Banksy vs Eine", Gallery V1, Copenhagen (Denmark)

2002: "We Like Printing", Alife, New York (USA)

2002: "We Like Printing", Artomatic, London (UK)

Art fairs and festivals 
2019: Youth Unity Day, London (UK)

2019: Art Car Boot Fair, London (UK)

2019: Nuart, Aberdeen (UK)

2019: SCOPE New York, Corey Helford Gallery, New York (USA)

2018: Manchester Art Fair, Leon Martyn, Manchester (UK)

2018: Beyond The Streets, Los Angeles (USA)

2018: Mural Festival, Montreal (Canada)

2018: CONTEXT Art Miami, Black Book Gallery, Miami (USA)

2018: Moniker Art Fair, Landmark Street Art, London (UK)

2018: Moniker International Art Fair Brooklyn, Spoke Art, New York (USA)

2017: CONTEXT Art Miami, Black Book Gallery, Miami (USA)

2017: Art Miami, Vroom & Varossieau, Miami (USA)

2017: London Art Fair, Jealous Gallery, London (UK)

2016: CONTEXT Art Miami, Black Book Gallery, Miami (USA)

2016: London Original Print Fair, Jealous Gallery, London (UK)

2014: ARTMUC, MUCA, Munich (Germany)

2012: SCOPE New York, Corey Helford Gallery, New York (USA)

2011: SCOPE Miami, White Walls, Miami (USA)

2011: Outpost, Paste Modernism 3, Sydney (Australia)

2007: Portobello Film Festival, Westbourne Studios, London (UK)

2007: Nuart, Stavanger (Norway)

Talks and juries 
2019: "Contemporary Art by Ben Eine", Pixel Show, Sao Paulo (Brazil)

2019: "The Written Word", The British Library, London (UK)

2019: "Inspiring City" Art Republic , Brighton (uk)

2018: "Saving Banksy", Talk & Documentary Review at Soho house, Amsterdam (Netherlands)

2018: "From Vandalism to Fine Art" TEDx Talk, University of East Anglia, Norwich (UK)

Films and documentaries 
2019: "Rom Boys", documentary

2018: "X Art", documentary

2017: "Saving Banksy", documentary

2012: "Art Battle L.A." documentary

2011: "Graffiti Wars", documentary

2011: "Outside In: The Story of Art in the Streets", documentary

2020: "Banksy and the Rise of Outlaw Art", documentary

Radio appearances and podcasts 
2019: Killa Kela

2019: Mizog Art

2019: Art Republic

2019: Radio National Australia

2018: Bench Talk 91

2018: BBC Radio

2018: TikiChrisTalks

2015: Berlin Community Radio

2014: Vantage Point Radio

2011: Mike Maxwell

References

External links

Official website
The OT (OurTypes) website
Interview with Eine and his work
A complete alphabet of Eine's shutters
Eine Flickr Group
The Beneine Forum
Sebastian Peiter's documentary about street art featuring Eine's work
Collection of Ben Eine Originals

1970 births
Artists from London
English graffiti artists
English contemporary artists
Living people